Pitḫana (Pythanas) was a Bronze Age king, during the 18th century BC (middle chronology), of the Anatolian city of Kuššara, and a forerunner of the later Hittite dynasty.

During his reign he conquered the city of Kanesh, heart of the Assyrian trading colonies network in Anatolia, and core of the Hittite-speaking territories.

The seal of an agricultural official Ilī-Samas has been discovered with several texts at Tell al-Rimah. The seal describes Ilī-Samas as being a servant of a name that may be Pitḫana, which could correspond to King Pitḫana of Kuššara. If so, the seal is dated to approximately year 20 of the reign of King Samsu-iluna of Babylon (c. 1730 BC according to the middle chronology or c. 1666 BC according to the short chronology).

He was succeeded by his son, Anitta, who is best known for conquering Hattusa, the future Hittite capital, and memorializing his achievement using the Hittite language.

See also

History of the Hittites

References

External links
Reign of Pithana

Kings of Kussara
18th-century BC rulers